Palo Pinto Mountains State Park is an undeveloped 4,000 plus acre state park in Palo Pinto and Stephens County, Texas near the City of Strawn. The park is located in the Western Cross Timbers Ecoregion. The park is administered by the Texas Parks and Wildlife Department which bought the property from private landowners in October 2011. The park has not received any development money and is not yet open to the public.

The park land was originally a ranch. The land surrounds Tucker Lake, which is owned by the City of Strawn and provides drinking water for the town.

Nature

Flora
The park is home to various types of trees, including live oak, blackjack oak, Texas red oak, post oak, Texas ash, prickly ash, cedar elm, mesquite, ashe juniper and pecan. There are bluebonnets, Indian blanket, prickly poppy, coreopsis, soft goldenaster, Texas bluebell, little bluestem, prickly pear cactus and sideoats grama, the state grass of Texas.

Fauna
The park has white-tailed deer, wild turkey, raccoons, squirrels, and various small mammals and a variety of songbirds. Fish found in Tucker Lake include bass, catfish, crappie, bluegill and sunfish.

References

State parks of Texas
Protected areas of Palo Pinto County, Texas
Protected areas of Stephens County, Texas